David Spence VC (1818 – 17 April 1877) was a Scottish recipient of the Victoria Cross.

Details
Spence was born in 1818 in Inverkeithing, Fife, Scotland. He joined the 9th Queen's Royal Lancers in 1842. When he was 40 years old, and a troop sergeant-major in the 9th Lancers, British Army during the Indian Mutiny when the following deed took place on 17 January 1858 at Shumsabad, India for which he was awarded the VC:

Further information
He later achieved the rank of regimental sergeant-major and in 1862 became a Yeoman of the Guard.

The medal
His Victoria Cross is displayed at the Regimental Museum of the 9th/12th Royal Lancers in Derby Museum, England.

References

Monuments to Courage (David Harvey, 1999)
The Register of the Victoria Cross (This England, 1997)
Scotland's Forgotten Valour (Graham Ross, 1995)

External links
Location of grave and VC medal (S. London)

1818 births
1877 deaths
British recipients of the Victoria Cross
9th Queen's Royal Lancers soldiers
Indian Rebellion of 1857 recipients of the Victoria Cross
People from Inverkeithing
British military personnel of the First Anglo-Sikh War
British military personnel of the Second Anglo-Sikh War
British Army recipients of the Victoria Cross